Nofuentes is a locality and a minor local entity situated in the province of Burgos, in the autonomous community of Castilla y León, in Spain, region of Las Merindades, judicial party of Villarcayo, capital of Merindad de Cuesta Urria municipality.

General data 
In 2011 it hosted 144 villagers. It is situated 80 km to the north of the capital of the province, Burgos, in the left edge of Nela.

Communications 
 Road: National Highway N-629 between Trespaderne y Medina de Pomar. 
 Railway: Until its closing in 1985, Railway station to Santander-Mediterráneo.

Administrative situation 

Its main mayor is José Pablo Quintanilla Rodriguez from Partido Popular.

History 

This villa belonged to the Merindad de Cuesta Urria in Castilla la Vieja party, one of the fourteen parties that formed the Burgos´ 
quartermaster during the period between 1785 and 1833, as it is shown in the Floriblanca census of 1787 with a royal jurisdiction. After the fall of the Ancien Régime, it is aggregated to the Merindad Cuesta-Urria´s constitutional town hall, in the Villarcayo´s party belonging to the region of Castilla la Vieja, being its capital.

Festivities and customs 

Its local festivities are held 15 May, Saint Isidro Labrador festivity and 29 June, Saint Pedro and San Pablo de Tarso festivity

Parish 

Parochial catholic church of San Pedro and San Pablo in the Archpriesthood of Medina de Pomar, Burgos´ Archbishopric´s diocese. The next locations depend on this church: Cebolleros, Mijangos, Las Quintanillas Las Quintanillas, Urria (Burgos),Valdelacuesta, Villamagrín, Villapanillo, Villarán y Villavedeo y and the convent of mother Clarisas of Nuestra Señora de Rivas.

References

External links 

Página sobre Nofuentes

Burgos